Marinobacter excellens is a Gram-negative and halophilic bacterium from the genus of Marinobacter which has been isolated from sediments from the Chazhma Bay from the Sea of Japan.

References

External links
Type strain of Marinobacter excellens at BacDive -  the Bacterial Diversity Metadatabase

Further reading 
 
 
 
 

Alteromonadales
Bacteria described in 2003
Halophiles